The chief of the Toronto Police Service is the professional head of the Toronto Police Service (TPS). Under the direction of the Toronto Police Services Board, the chief is responsible for the management and administration of the police service's operations.

Myron Demkiw is the current chief of police, having assumed office on December 19, 2022.

Overview 
Section 41 of the Police Services Act legally defines the role of police chiefs in Ontario. Under this law, the chief is responsible for administering the police force and overseeing its operation in accordance with the objectives, priorities and policies established by the board, ensuring that members of the police force carry out their duties in accordance with the Police Services Act in a manner that reflects the needs of the community, maintaining discipline in the police force, ensuring that the police force provides community-oriented police services, and administering the complaints system.

The Toronto Police Services Board recruits and dismisses the chief. Day-to-day policing and operational decisions of the Toronto Police Service are made by the chief, but must be consistent with the policies and objectives set by the Toronto Police Services Board.

History 
The position was known as "high constable" when the Toronto Police Department was formed until 1859 and then as "chief constable" until 1957, when the Toronto Police Department was amalgamated with 12 other Toronto-area forces to form the Metropolitan Toronto Police.

List of chiefs of police

References 

Canadian